"Searchin for Some Kind of Clue" is a song written by Nelson Larkin, Donny Kees and Pal Rakes, and recorded by American country music artist Billy Joe Royal.  It was released in May 1990 as the first single from the album Out of the Shadows.  The song reached number 17 on the Billboard Hot Country Singles & Tracks chart.

Chart performance

References

1990 singles
Billy Joe Royal songs
Atlantic Records singles
Songs written by Nelson Larkin
1990 songs
Songs written by Donny Kees